Nothogynus is a genus of mites placed in its own family, Nothogynidae, in the order Mesostigmata. Nothogynus contains two recognized species:

 Nothogynus camini Walter & Krantz, 1999
 Nothogynus klompeni Walter & Krantz, 1999

References

Mesostigmata